Khursheed Nowrojee Jeejeebhoy  (born August 26, 1935) was a gastroenterologist at the Toronto General Hospital, St. Michael's Hospital, Unity Health Toronto and professor of medicine, nutrition and physiology at the University of Toronto, best known for his pioneering work in the development of parenteral nutrition.

Biography
Jeejeebhoy was born in Rangoon, Burma on August 26, 1935, to Nowrojee Jeejeebhoy and Gulbanoo Nowrojee (Tarapore) Jeejeebhoy. The family was evacuated to India by air in a DC-3 ahead of advancing Japanese forces during the Japanese invasion of Burma. His father joined the army, and his maternal grandfather Pheroze Khurshetjee Tarapore was recalled to service after he had retired as an officer in the Indian Medical Service.

Due to World War II and his family's flight to India as refugees, Jeejeebhoy's schooling was initially very checkered. After his family fled to India, they lived a nomadic life and whether or not he attended school depended on where his father was stationed. However, his maternal grandmother Rattan Tarapore, a medical doctor trained at JJ Hospital Medical School, home schooled him. At age 15 he entered Nirmala College in Delhi and studied economics and political science. At age 17, upon hearing of the excellence of Christian Medical College Vellore he applied for one of the ten spots available to students not sponsored by a Christian Mission. Entrance was by competitive written exam and interview. He was the first one called to fill one of the ten spots. He convocated in February 1959, capturing nine of ten gold medals.

His graduate medical training was in London.

He is married and had three children.

References

1935 births
Living people
Academic staff of the University of Toronto